Roberto Bautista Agut defeated Tomáš Berdych in the final, 6–4, 3–6, 6–3 to win the singles tennis title at the 2019 ATP Qatar Open.

Gaël Monfils was the reigning champion, but did not participate this year.

Seeds

Draw

Finals

Top half

Bottom half

Qualifying

Seeds

Qualifiers

Lucky loser

Qualifying draw

First qualifier

Second qualifier

Third qualifier

Fourth qualifier

References
 
Singles Draw
Qualifying Draw

Qatar ExxonMobil Open - Singles
Singles
Qatar Open (tennis)